}}

The 2002 Wisconsin gubernatorial election  was held on November 5, 2002. Incumbent Republican Governor of Wisconsin Scott McCallum, who had assumed office upon the resignation of Tommy Thompson, ran for his first full term in office. McCallum won his party's nomination by defeating two minor candidates, and Attorney General of Wisconsin Jim Doyle won the Democratic primary with a little more than a third of the vote in a highly competitive primary election. In the general election, the presence of Ed Thompson, former Governor Tommy Thompson's younger brother, the Mayor of Tomah, and the Libertarian Party nominee, held both McCallum and Doyle to under fifty percent of the vote, enabling Doyle to win with 45% of the vote, defeating McCallum.

Democratic primary
The primary election for the Democratic nomination was closely contested by three competitive candidates. The race was ultimately won by Jim Doyle with around 38% of the vote.

Candidates

Nominated
Jim Doyle, three-term Attorney General of Wisconsin, former District Attorney of Dane County, Wisconsin.

Eliminated in primary
Tom Barrett, five-term U.S. Representative from Wisconsin's 5th congressional district, former state senator and state representative
Kathleen Falk, Dane County Executive, former Assistant Wisconsin Attorney General, general counsel for Wisconsin's Environmental Decade, Inc.

Polling

Results

Republican primary
McCallum, as the incumbent governor, did not face significant opposition in the primary.  He was nominated with 86% of the primary vote.

Candidates

Nominated
Scott McCallum, incumbent Governor of Wisconsin

Eliminated in primary
William Lorge, former State Representative
George Pobuda, teacher in Tomahawk, Wisconsin

Results

Libertarian party
Ed Thompson, former Mayor of Tomah, Wisconsin, brother of former Governor Tommy Thompson

Green party
Jim Young, City assessor for Sun Prairie, Wisconsin

Reform party
Alan D. Eisenberg, lawyer and real estate dealer

Independent candidates
Ty A. Bollerud, of Janesville, Wisconsin
Mike Mangan, of Oconomowoc, Wisconsin
Aneb Jah Rasta, consultant and doctor of metaphysics

General election

Predictions

Polling

Results

See also
2002 United States gubernatorial elections

References

External links

2002
Governor
2002 United States gubernatorial elections